St. Paul High School is a Catholic high school in Ottawa, Ontario, Canada.

History 
The school originally opened in 1978 under the name Bells Corners Senior Elementary School. It was located at 411 Seyton Drive in the Bells Corners neighbourhood in the city of Nepean, Ontario. Delays in construction meant that the school was late in opening, students were not able to move in until October. Students spent the first month attending classes at their old schools. The school community asked that the school be renamed after Saint Paul, and the name was changed within the first year.

At first, it was a junior high school only, but after several years of renovations and adding more grades one by one each year, it finally opened as a full high school serving grades 7 through OAC in September 1987. It also adopted the new motto of "Fill Your Minds With All That Is True" at the same time. The school colours of brown and gold had to be replaced because they were the same as those of nearby Bell High School at the other end of Bells Corners. The colours of gold, blue and white took their place.

The following school year, 1988–1989, the school underwent another construction project. The portables were moved into the parking lot, leaving an empty space closer to the building. During the course of the year, a new ten classroom building was constructed, called the portapak. Construction finished around May 1989 and some classes were moved in from the portables.

At the beginning of the 1989-1990 school year, four more portables arrived, bringing the total (including the ten rooms in the portapak) to almost thirty. That year, construction took place on Holy Trinity High School in nearby Kanata. Holy Trinity was being built with the intention of reducing the level of overcrowding at St. Paul's.

Although Holy Trinity was supposed to open in time for the 1990 school year, a strike of construction workers put the school behind schedule, and it was not ready when school began.
The solution was to have the building on Seyton Drive serve as both schools temporarily. Students attending St. Paul's went in the morning, starting classes an hour earlier than usual, and finished at noon. Students attending Holy Trinity attended during the afternoon. That continued for two months, until Holy Trinity was finally ready to open at the beginning of November.

At some point in the early 1990s, the name of the school was changed from St Paul's to St. Paul. Items around the school, including the sign over the main entrance, were altered to reflect this change.

In 1999, the school board made a surprise move by selling the building on Seyton Drive while purchasing the former John A. Macdonald school, which was being used by Champlain Elementary School and Collège catholique Franco-Ouest, of the French Catholic School Board. The new location would be located on Draper Avenue in the neighbourhood of Pinecrest, a few kilometres to the east. That was done without consulting or notifying the students of St Paul or their parents, and it caused a great deal of concern and even anger because it meant students would be travelling longer distances to get to school and also because the building was in need of many renovations. The school has since undergone many extensive renovations with the Ottawa-Carleton Catholic School Board investing five million dollars to refurbish the facility and to bring it up to current standards. It has two gymnasia with hardwood floors, a university-style lecture hall, a cafeteria, new science and tech labs and an auditorium that can hold 750 spectators, ideal for both school and Board-wide performing arts initiatives.

The old building on Seyton Drive became Franco-Ouest, and has since undergone further expansion, with a new wing filling the courtyard that used to lie between the cafeteria and the industrial arts workshops.

The school logo is in the shape of a pentagon, with the two angled sides converging at the bottom. It has a blue border on a white background. In the centre, there is a blue cross with the school name “St. Paul” printed vertically on the cross in white letters. A gold maple leaf in the background silhouettes the cross. The crest is draped with a gold banner having a blue border. Written on the banner are the words of the school's motto: “Fill Your Minds With All That Is True.”

School life 

The school mascot is a bear.  Sports teams at St. Paul were originally known as the St. Paul Bears, but in the early 1990s that name gradually transitioned into the Golden Bears, a name which continues to exist today.

St. Paul along with other schools in the city united to beat the Guinness World record for the "Biggest Bear Hug"

St. Paul has become well known for its arts productions, most notable of which is the major dramatic performance which takes place towards the end of each year, and usually requires the majority of the school year before that to prepare. Performances over the years have included You're A Good Man, Charlie Brown, 1873: The Farmer's Revolt, Beaver Tales, Anne of Green Gables, Jitters, Dracula: The Musical?!, But Why Bump Off Barnaby, Little Shop Of Horrors, The Legend of Sleepy Hollow and many more. Recently, the school performed a Canadian play, "Unity 1918", capturing the post-war Spanish Flu epidemic in Western Canada. The production won awards for Comic Actress in a Play (Stephanie Fields) and Ensemble in a Play (Caleigh McEachern and Anne Charbonneau) at the 2005-2006 Cappies Awards. During the 2007-2008 year, the school put on a production of Annie Weisman's "Be Aggressive."   The school's performance of Unity 1918, capturing the post-war Spanish Flu epidemic in Western Canada won awards for Comic Actress in a Play (Stephanie Fields) and Ensemble in a Play (Caleigh McEachern and Anne Charbonneau) at the 2005-2006 Cappies Awards.   The school also received a cappies award in 2008-2009. For best ensemble (Hilary Smith, and Clancy Adami) the play they performed was Arsenic and Old Lace. Other credits include: Jeremy Sanders as Reverend Harper, Natalia Chiarlelli as Off. Klein and Skylor Cloutier as Mr. Witherspoon.

Starting in the early nineties, students at St. Paul started making trips to the Dominican Republic to provide help to people in need there. Starting in the 1994-1995 school year, it began as a yearly event. Approximately 10 students and 2 teachers spent months prior to the March departure learning Spanish, fund raising and getting prepared for the experience. In 1995, students started Casa Cafe, which was a fundraiser organized and operated by the students. 
 
The group would travel for two weeks, landing in Santo Domingo - the capital of the Dominican Republic, and then traveling to San Jose de Ocoa to work in the rural farmland. Some of the jobs worked on by students includes: building a school, building and painting homes, and working on an irrigation/water system. Students initially lived with families (prior to 1995), but it was considered safer for students and teachers to live as a group. Often the students and teachers would stay in a school or church.

Following a week in the mountainous region of the Dominican Republic, the group would travel to Quisqueya where they spent time interacting with the church community and visited the bateyes (villages where the Haitian sugar cane workers live). The students also picked sugar cane and helped load it onto trucks.   
 
Over the years students have raised tens of thousands of dollars and have brought down medical and school supplies. Each year, upon their return, students would put on a multi-media presentation to show the St. Paul community the work that they have done.

In recent news, St. Paul High School has applied to be an Arts Major high school. The specialties would include intense study on dramatic arts, theatre tech, computer design and music. Grade 7 and Grade 8 students participated in a production of "High School Musical".

The Catholic school board also recently finished their production of "Once Upon a Mattress". The production is cast with all the students in the catholic school board and also introduces the talent of the elementary school choirs. The show received positive reviews for its sound, lighting, sets and costumes.

Reunion 

The 20th and first school reunion was held at OnTap in 1998.  It was well attended and started forming the school's identity along with continuing to uphold its spirit. 
 
St. Paul High School celebrated its 25th anniversary in May 2004, with many former students returning to commemorate their time at the school along with a music band made up of former STP students.  It took place at the school's new location on Draper Ave over 3 days.

In December 2007, it was announced that a celebration of the school's 30th anniversary was to be held on April 3, 2008. The event took place at a location away from the school, Grace O'Malley's pub playing host. Many current and former students and faculty were in attendance.

The school's 35th anniversary was celebrated on June 1, 2013, with D'Arcy McGee's pub on Terry Fox Drive hosting.

On May 26, 2018 the school's 40th anniversary reunion was celebrated at The Heart and Crown Pub in Barrhaven.

Notable alumni

Sean O'Donnell, former National Hockey League player.
 Paul Byron, hockey player, Montreal Canadiens
Alison Smyth, actor
Robin Brûlé, actor
 Tim Tierney, Ottawa City Councillor - Beacon Hill-Cyrville
Tyler Crapigna, football player, Saskatchewan Roughriders
 Shermar Cuba Paul, rapper, Night Lovell

See also
List of high schools in Ontario

References

External links 
School website
St. Paul School History

Catholic secondary schools in Ontario
High schools in Ottawa
Educational institutions established in 1978
1978 establishments in Ontario
Middle schools in Ottawa